Ambrosia (minor planet designation: 193 Ambrosia) is a main belt asteroid that was discovered by the Corsican-born French astronomer J. Coggia on February 28, 1879, and named after Ambrosia, the food of the gods in Greek mythology.

In 2009, photometric observations of this asteroid were made at the Palmer Divide Observatory in Colorado Springs, Colorado. The resulting light curve shows a synodic rotation period of 6.580 ± 0.001 hours with a brightness variation of 0.11 ± 0.02 in magnitude. This result is consistent with an independent study performed in 1996.

References

External links 
 Lightcurve plot of 193 Ambrosia, Palmer Divide Observatory, B. D. Warner (2009)
 Asteroid Lightcurve Database (LCDB), query form (info )
 Dictionary of Minor Planet Names, Google books
 Asteroids and comets rotation curves, CdR – Observatoire de Genève, Raoul Behrend
 Discovery Circumstances: Numbered Minor Planets (1)-(5000) – Minor Planet Center
 
 

Background asteroids
Ambrosia
Ambrosia
Sk-type asteroids (SMASS)
18790228